Ficus tinctoria, also known as dye fig, or humped fig is a hemiepiphytic tree of genus Ficus. It is also one of the species known as strangler fig.

It is found in Asia, Malesia, northern Australia, and the South Pacific islands. It grows in moist valleys.

Palms are favorable host species. Root systems of dye fig can come together to be self sustaining but the epiphyte usually falls if the host tree dies or rots away.

In Australia it is recorded as a medium-sized tree with smooth, oval green leaves. It is found often growing in rocky areas or over boulders. The leaves are asymmetrical.

The small rust brown fruit of the dye fig are the source of a red dye used in traditional fabric making in parts of Oceania and Indonesia.

The fruit is also edible and constitute as a major food source in the low-lying atolls of Micronesia and Polynesia.

Subspecies
Ficus tinctoria subsp. gibbosa is an accepted subspecies.

References

External links

Cook Islands Biodiversity : Ficus tinctoria - Dye Fig

tinctoria
Ficus tinctoria
Micronesian cuisine
Polynesian cuisine
Flora of the Pacific
Flora of Malesia
Flora of Japan
Flora of China
Flora of Taiwan
Flora of Australia